The 2007 Kaduna State gubernatorial election occurred on April 14, 2007. Namadi Sambo of the PDP defeated other candidates by polling 1,326,632 popular votes, ANPP's Sani Muhammed Sha'aban was closest contender with 478,725 votes and AC's Muhammad Suleman Zantu scoring 109,415 votes.

Namadi Sambo emerged winner in the PDP gubernatorial primary election. His running mate was Patrick Ibrahim Yakowa.

Of the 17 candidates who contested in the election, all were male, without any female aspirants. Only but one deputy governorship candidate, Jummai Tanko, was female contesting under NCP alongside Isa Adamu Abdullahi, vying for governorship.

Electoral system 
The Governor of Kaduna State is elected using the plurality voting system.

Primary election

PDP primary
A run-off election was organized for the PDP governorship primary election, held on December 12, 2006, when no aspirant could emerge victorious at the first ballot in which Arc. Namadi Sambo came topmost with 2,379 votes, followed by Sen. Isaiah Balat with 1,493 votes.

Candidates 
 Party nominee: Namadi Sambo: 2,379 votes
 Running mate: Patrick Ibrahim Yakowa:(Incumbent deputy governor): 252 votes
 Isaiah Balat: 1,493 votes
 Suleiman Othman Hunkuyi: 1,226 votes
 Lawal  Yakawada: 309 votes
 Falalu Bello: 220 votes
 Shuaib Idris Mikati: 126 votes
 Garba Madaki Ali: 81 votes

Results
A total of 17 candidates registered with the Independent National Electoral Commission to contest in the election. The PDP candidate won, defeating ANPP's Hon. Sani Mohammed Sha'aban, and 15 other minor party candidates.

The total number of registered voters in the state was 3,374,245.

References 

Kaduna State gubernatorial elections
Kaduna State gubernatorial election
Kaduna State gubernatorial election